Kaczyzm is a Polish neologism and an ideological concept (ideologeme) pejoratively or satirically describing the rule of the Law and Justice party (PiS), derived from the names of Polish politicians, brothers Jarosław and Lech Kaczyński. As an ironic or propaganda term, it is used by opponents of the political groups of the Kaczyński brothers, while considered inaccurate and offensive by PiS supporters. Although in recent years the phrase has been reappropriated by supporters of Law and Justice and is sometimes compared to Trumpism in the United States.

History 
The triumph of Kaczyzm), as a pejorative definition of the political doctrine and vision of the state by Jarosław Kaczyński.

Shortly thereafter, during a debate in the Sejm on May 5 that year, in a heated debate between the then governing Democratic Left Alliance (SLD) and the opposition Law and Justice deputies, this term was used by deputy Joanna Senyszyn, who asserted that the latter party would, if it were to come to power following the parliamentary and presidential elections in autumn that year, institute a "non-democratic, fascist Fourth Polish Republic", which she saw as "kaczyzm approaching". She then added that "a specter is haunting Poland—the specter of kaczyzm", thus paraphrasing the first sentence of the Communist Manifesto. Due to her popularization of the slogan, the authorship is sometimes mistakenly attributed to Senyszyn.

Usage and meaning 
Kaczyzm, as a neologism for political ideology, is a type of an ideological concept or an ideologeme. It is one of the best known Polish-language examples of the linguistic construction in the form of derogatory neologisms based on the names of politicians and occurring in the context of political discourse. The popularity of this particular term may, as Bolt and Szerszunowicz say, be attributed to the fact that Kaczyński brothers are often pejoratively nicknamed Kaczory (lit. drakes) or Kaczki (lit. ducks). A few derivative terms, which are also pejorative, also exist, such as kaczysta (lit. Kaczist, a supporter of Kaczyński's policies) and antykaczyzm (lit. anti-Kaczism), of which the latter was used by Jarosław Kaczyński himself. 

Similar terms exist in Polish (e.g. lepperyzm, tuskizm), and other languages, including English (see Stalinism, McCarthyism, Thatcherism). They are usually pejorative and intend to emphasize the boundaries of "we" vs "others", and to easily "label" political opponents.

This concept is still often used on the pages of the media outlets critical of the Law and Justice (PiS) party, such as the weekly Newsweek Polska. In an interview to the left-wing "NIE" newspaper December 2005, when asked to clarify what kaczyzm meant to her, Joanna Senyszyn defined the term as "the Polish variation of 21st-century totalitarianism... [in which] everything mixes: limitations on democracy, a peculiar type of oppression, censorship... [Kaczyzm] exists in a camouflaged form. It is dressed in the garment of social solidarity, patriotism and moral renewal". According to Wojciech Szalkiewicz, kaczyzm means a system based on "permanent control, investigative scandals, appointing super-offices and ad hoc commissions of inquiry", while Leszek Balcerowicz described Kaczism as "unprecedented attacks on the institutions combined with unsubstantiated attacks against judges".

See also 

 
 Fourth Polish Republic
 Mohair berets

 Negative campaigning

External links 

 Contemporary examples of usage of the term: kaczyzm, antykaczyzm, kaczysta (in Polish)

References 

Political catchphrases
Law and Justice
Eponymous political ideologies
2000s neologisms
History of Poland (1989–present)
Contemporary history of Poland
Democratic Left Alliance
Politics of Poland
Conservatism in Poland